The 1996 United States presidential election in Pennsylvania took place on November 5, 1996 as part of the 1996 United States presidential election. Voters chose 23 representatives, or electors to the Electoral College, who voted for president and vice president.

Pennsylvania was won by President Bill Clinton by a margin of 9.2%. Billionaire businessman Ross Perot (Reform Party of the United States of America-TX) finished in third, with 9.56% of the popular vote in Pennsylvania.

In Pennsylvania, Bill Clinton received 49.2% of the vote, the same percentage as the national vote (when rounded to the nearest tenth). , this is the last election in which the following counties voted for a Democratic Presidential candidate: Warren, Clinton, Westmoreland, Schuylkill, Armstrong, Columbia, Forest, and Indiana. Clinton became the first Democrat to win the White House without carrying Clearfield County since John F. Kennedy in 1960.

Primaries

Democratic Primary

Republican Primary

Results

Results by county

Counties that flipped from Democratic to Republican
Clearfield (Largest city: DuBois)

Counties that flipped from Republican to Democratic
Columbia (Largest city: Bloomsburg)
Schuylkill (Largest city: Pottsville)

See also
 List of United States presidential elections in Pennsylvania

References

Pennsylvania
1996
1996 Pennsylvania elections